Coptops tetrica is a species of beetle in the family Cerambycidae. It was described by Newman in 1842, originally under the genus Agelasta. It is known from the Philippines.

References

tetrica
Beetles described in 1842